Love, Damini is the sixth studio album by Burna Boy. It was released on 8 July 2022 through Atlantic Records. The album features guest appearances from Ladysmith Black Mambazo, J Hus, Vict0ny, Popcaan, Blxst, Kehlani, Ed Sheeran, J Balvin, and Khalid. It was supported by two singles, "Kilometre" and "Last Last". The album is named after Burna Boy's legal first name and serves as the follow-up to his previous album, Twice as Tall (2020).

Singles 
One song from the album, "Kilometre", was released as an independent single on 29 April 2021. Another single, "Last Last", was released on 13 May 2022, along with the announcement of the album.

Track listing

Notes
  indicates an additional producer
  indicates a co-producer
 "Last Last" contains a sample of "He Wasn't Man Enough", performed by Toni Braxton.
 "Different Size" contains audio sampled from the Korean version of "Squid Game".

Personnel
Musicians

 Burna Boy – vocals
 Ladysmith Black Mambazo – additional vocals (tracks 1, 19)
 Oise Benson – additional vocals (1)
 Gaetan Judd – guitar (2)
 Marco Bernardis – saxophone (2)
 Akerele Samson – background vocals (7)
 Asake – background vocals (7)
 Kwande Bawa – background vocals (7, 9)
 Olusola Ogundipo – background vocals (7)
 Jonathan Awotwe-Mensah – background vocals (9)
 Keven Wolfsohn – background vocals (9)
 Paul Bogumil – background vocals (9)
 Uncle T – background vocals (9)
 Tony Mars – saxophone (15)
 Nissi Ogulu – additional vocals (16)
 Shuga Saund – guitar (16)
 Jon Bellion – backing vocals, instruments, programming (17)
 Jordan K. Johnson – backing vocals, instruments, programming (17)
 Stefan Johnson – backing vocals, instruments, programming (17)
 Michael Pollack – backing vocals (17)
 David Campbell – conductor, orchestral arrangement (17)
 Steve Churchyard – orchestration (17)
 Jacob Braun – cello (17)
 Paula Hochhalter – cello (17)
 Ross Gasworth – cello (17)
 Dylan Hart – French horn (17)
 Pierre-Luc Rioux – guitar (17)
 Thomas Hooten – trumpet (17)
 Andrew Duckles – viola (17)
 David Walther – viola (17)
 Charlie Bisharat – violin (17)
 Joel Pargman – violin (17)
 Josefina Vergara – violin (17)
 Kerenza Peacock – violin (17)
 Mario De Leon – violin (17)
 Michele Richards – violin (17)
 Neil Samples – violin (17)
 Sara Parkins – violin (17)
 Sarah Thornblade – violin (17)
 Jorja Smith – additional vocals (18)
 Kamaru Usman – additional vocals (18)
 Naomi Campbell – additional vocals (18)
 Swizz Beatz – additional vocals (18)
 Dunni Alexandra Lawal – background vocals (18)

Technical
 Gerhard Westphalen – mastering
 Jesse Ray Ernster – mixing (all tracks), recording (3)
 The Elements – recording (1)
 P2J – recording (2, 10, 13)
 Eric Isaac Utere – recording (3, 4, 6, 9, 11, 14)
 Chopstix – recording (4, 7)
 Kel-P – recording (5)
 Otis Milestone – recording (12, 18, 19)
 Telz – recording (16)
 Joe Begalla – mixing assistance
 Noah "MixGiant" Glassman – mixing assistance

Reception

Charts

Weekly charts

Year-end charts

Certifications

See also
 List of UK R&B Albums Chart number ones of 2022

References

2022 albums
Burna Boy albums
Yoruba-language albums
Igbo-language albums